Coleophora kandevanella is a moth of the family Coleophoridae. It is found in Iran.

References

kandevanella
Fauna of Iran
Moths described in 1952
Moths of the Middle East